Machang is a town of Quanjiao County in eastern Anhui province, China, located approximately midway between Nanjing (Jiangsu) and Hefei and  west of the county seat and  southwest of Chuzhou. , it has 16 villages under its administration. The Hefei–Nanjing Passenger Railway passes through the town.

See also
List of township-level divisions of Hebei

References

Towns in Anhui